Struten Lighthouse is a coastal lighthouse in the municipality of Fredrikstad in Viken, Norway. The lighthouse is located on an islet in the outer Oslofjord, south of the island Hankø. It was established in 1907, and automated in 1985.

See also

 List of lighthouses in Norway
 Lighthouses in Norway

References

External links
 Norsk Fyrhistorisk Forening 

Lighthouses completed in 1907
Lighthouses in Viken